Eyarth railway station served the village of Llanfair Dyffryn Clwyd in Denbighshire, Wales, between the years of 1864 and 1962. It is located west off an unnamed minor road of off Wrexham road south of Ruthin (grid reference SJ 131557). 
It had one platform and a goods loop at the end. The station house is now a Bed and Breakfast and part of the platform still exists,

References

Further reading

External links

www.subbrit.org.uk

Disused railway stations in Denbighshire
History of Denbighshire
Railway stations in Great Britain closed in 1953
Railway stations in Great Britain opened in 1864
Former London and North Western Railway stations